"The Magic Key" is a 2003 hip-hop/electronic song recorded by French animated feature One-T + Cool-T. It was the third single from the album The One-T ODC and was released in April 2003. The song samples 'Má Hra' (1971 album 'Nová Syntéza') by Blue Effect, a Czechoslovakian progressive rock band.

It was the third most played songs on European radio and television during the third quarter of 2003 and performed one of the longest-running singles in the 2003 French SNEP Singles Charts (41 weeks), peaking at #9. The song was also a top five hit in Denmark, Poland, Germany and Austria, and a top ten hit in Belgium (Wallonia) and Switzerland. To date, it remains One-T's most successful single. An animated music video was also released, featuring the characters on the single cover.

The singer behind Cool-T (rap) is Christine Asamoah. The vocals for the chorus were provided by Virginie Tesnière.

In 2015, a French version titled "DJ" featuring the chorus and samples of the song has been released by the French singer Dieselle.

Track listings
 CD single
 "The Magic Key" – 3:49
 "The Travoltino Club" – 4:00

 CD maxi
 "The Magic Key" (radio edit) – 3:50
 "The Magic Key" (club mix) – 6:42
 "The Magic Key" (extended mix) – 6:05
 "The Magic Key" (instrumental) – 3:51
 "The Magic Key" (a capella) – 3:25

 12" maxi
 "The Magic Key" (radio edit) – 3:50
 "The Magic Key" (club mix) – 6:42
 "The Magic Key" (extended mix) – 6:05
 "The Magic Key" (instrumental) – 3:51
 "The Magic Key" (a capella) – 3:25

Credits
 Featuring by Cool-T
 Co-produced by Proedit
 Produced by Minor T

Charts and sales

Weekly charts

Year-end charts

Certifications

References

2003 singles
One-T songs
French electronic songs
2002 songs
Universal Records singles
Polydor Records singles
Animated music videos
Songs about death
Songs about friendship
Songs about ghosts